Șimian is a river island on the Danube belonging to Romania, just downstream of the city of Turnu Severin and overlooking the town of Șimian. The island is home to the reconstructed fortress relocated from the historic Ada Kaleh island, when it was due to be submerged by the Iron Gate I dam building in 1968. For that reason, it is also known as the "New Ada Kaleh", although the ambitious resettlement plan has never been completed.

During the construction of the Trajan's Bridge in the 2nd century AD, the island served as a natural base for water dividing dams.

References

External links
 

Islands of the Danube
River islands of Romania